Asterolepis may refer to:

Asterolepis (fish), a genus of extinct armored fishes in the family Asterolepididae.
Asterolepis (moth), a genus of moths in the family Tortricidae.